The 1985–86 NBA season was the Kings' 37th season in the NBA and first in Sacramento following its relocation from Kansas City. The Kings played their home games at the original ARCO Arena, and finished the season with a record of 37 wins and 45 losses, placing them fifth in the Midwest Division and seventh in the Western Conference.  They made the playoffs, but were quickly eliminated in the first round in three straight games by the eventual Western Conference champion Houston Rockets.

On April 16, 1985, the NBA board of governors voted 22–0 for the Kings to be relocated to Sacramento. They moved into the first ARCO Arena, their temporary home for three seasons.

The team performed preseason workouts at Yuba College.

Sacramento did not start the season well, having a 9–22 record on December 31, the worst in the Western Conference.

Draft picks

Roster

Regular season

Season standings

z – clinched division title
y – clinched division title
x – clinched playoff spot

Record vs. opponents

Game log

Playoffs

|- align="center" bgcolor="#ffcccc"
| 1
| April 17
| @ Houston
| L 87–107
| Reggie Theus (18)
| LaSalle Thompson (17)
| Reggie Theus (4)
| The Summit15,101
| 0–1
|- align="center" bgcolor="#ffcccc"
| 2
| April 19
| @ Houston
| L 103–111
| Reggie Theus (19)
| LaSalle Thompson (10)
| Reggie Theus (7)
| The Summit16,016
| 0–2
|- align="center" bgcolor="#ffcccc"
| 3
| April 22
| Houston
| L 98–113
| Eddie Johnson (33)
| three players tied (8)
| Reggie Theus (8)
| ARCO Arena I10,333
| 0–3
|-

Player statistics

Season

Playoffs

Awards and records

Transactions

References

See also
 1985–86 NBA season

Sacramento Kings seasons
Sac
Sacramento
Sacramento